Leonardo Da Besozzo or Leonardo Dei Molinari (15th century) was an Italian painter, active in Lombardy and Naples.

Biography
Leonardo is the son of Michelino Molinari da Besozzo, a prominent painter in Lombardy in the early, 15th century.

Born in Besozzo, he also worked in Naples with Perinetto da Benevento in the fresco decoration of the church of San Giovanni a Carbonara.

References

15th-century births
15th-century deaths
People from the Province of Varese
15th-century Italian painters
Italian male painters